Sansão e Dalila (English: Samson and Delilah) is a Brazilian miniseries produced and broadcast by RecordTV. It premiered on January 4, 2011 and ended on February 2, 2011. The series is based on the Book of Judges.

Plot 
Sansão is a brave, strong, courageous man, a Hebrew who fights against many enemy armies of his people and wild animals; besides he keeps the mysterious secret of his strength. Born as the promise to be the liberator of his people, who were oppressed and persecuted. The triumph of Sansão reaches the ears of Dalila, a philistine woman who has an exuberant beauty and is very ambitious. She was chosen by Inarus, the prince of Gaza, to be another of the courtesans in his palace. In search of power, Dalila draws attention to being pretty and very soon becomes the favorite among all the courtesans. Sansão is unsurpassed, wins many battles and provokes the wrath of his main enemy, the Philistines. Prince Inarus is infuriated by every victory of the Hebrew warrior against his army so well armed and prepared that he allows Dalila to try to persuade Sansão to discover the secret of his strength.

Cast 
Fernando Pavão as Sansão
Mel Lisboa as Dalila
Thais Fersoza as Samara
Rafaela Mandelli as Ieda
Milhem Cortaz as Abbas
Marcelo Escorel as Inarus
Rogério Fróes as Alían
Roberto Pirillo as Simas
Claudio Gabriel as Heber
Lu Grimaldi as Zila
Juliana Lohmann as Judi
Miguel Thiré as Faruk
Karen Junqueira as Tais
Luiza Curvo as Myra
Leandro Léo as Carid
Emilio Dantas as Nora/Aron
Noemi Gerbelli as Ama
Ittala Nandi as Zaira
Nina de Pádua as Agar
João Vitti as Mensageiro
Roberto Frota as Manoa
Valéria Alencar como Hannah
Livia Rossy as Ayla
Luli Miller as Jana
Joana Balaguer as Yunet
Cássio Ramos as Alexis
Camilo Bevilacqua as Rudiju
Felipe Cardoso as Jidafe
Luiz Nicolau as Bak
Rodrigo Costa as Gadi

References

External links 

Brazilian telenovelas
RecordTV miniseries
Portuguese-language telenovelas
Television series based on the Bible
2011 Brazilian television series debuts
2011 Brazilian television series endings